The 1947 Tour de Romandie was the inaugural edition of the Tour de Romandie cycle race and was held from 15 May to 18 May 1947. The race started and finished in Geneva. The race was won by Désiré Keteleer.

General classification

References

1947
Tour de Romandie